Union councils of Patuakhali District are the smallest rural administrative and local government units in Patuakhali District of Bangladesh. There are 8 upazilas in Patuakhali district with 52 Union councils. The list are below:

Dumki Upazila
Dumki Upazila is divided into five union parishads:
 Angaria Union
 Labukhali Union
 Muradia Union
 Pangasia Union
 Sreerampur Union

Patuakhali Sadar Upazila
Patuakhali Sadar Upazila is divided into Patuakhali Municipality and 12 union parishads: 
 Auliapur Union
 Badarpur Union
 Boro Bighai Union
 Choto Bighai Union
 Itbaria Union
 Jainkathi Union
 Kalikapur Union
 Kamalapur Union
 Laukathi Union
 Lohalia Union
 Madarbunia Union
 Marichbunia Union

Mirzaganj Upazila
Mirzaganj Upazila is divided into Mirzaganj Municipality and six union parishads: 
 Amragachia Union
 Deuli Subidkhali Union
 Kakrabunia Union
 Madhabkhali Union
 Majidbaria Union
 Mirzaganj Union

Bauphal Upazila

Galachipa Upazila

Dashmina Upazila

Rangabali Upazila

Kalapara Upazila

References

Local government in Bangladesh